Papum Pare district (Pron:/ˌpæpəm ˈpæɹɪ or ˈpɑ:ɹeɪ/) is an administrative district in the state of Arunachal Pradesh in India. As of 2011, it is the most populous district of Arunachal Pradesh (out of 20).

History
The district was formed in 1999 when it was split from Lower Subansiri district.

Geography
The district headquarters are located at Yupia. The capital of the state is Itanagar.

Subdivisions
The district is divided into three subdivisions: Itanagar capital complex, Yupia, and Sagalee. The district is further divided into 15 administrative circles, namely, Balijan, Itanagar, Naharlagun, Doimukh, Toru, Sagalee, Leporiang, Mengio, Kimin, Banderdewa, Tarasso, Kakoi, Gumto, Parang, and Sangdupota.

There are 3 Arunachal Pradesh Legislative Assembly constituencies located in this district: Itanagar, Doimukh and Sagalee. All of these are part of Arunachal West Lok Sabha constituency.

Itanagar capital complex
 is administered by its own Deputy Commissioner, and contains the three circles of Itanagar, Naharlagun, and Banderdewa. In January 2013 the Arunachal Pradesh government approved in principle the creation of a "Capital district". The capital complex is currently treated as its own district by some government departments, the Ministry of Micro, Small and Medium Enterprises for example, and the Arunachal Pradesh State portal in particular.

Demographics

According to the 2011 census Papum Pare district has a population of 176,573, roughly equal to the nation of São Tomé and Príncipe. This gives it a ranking of 594th in India (out of a total of 640). Its population growth rate over the decade 2001–2011 was 44.57%. Papumpare has a sex ratio of 950 females for every 1000 males, and a literacy rate of 82.14%.

Papum Pare is inhabited by members of the Nyishi, who are traditionally followers of Donyi-Polo. Some members of the Nyishi tribe are followers of Christianity.

Religion
Christianity is the largest religion in the district, followed by over 47% of people. Hinduism is the second-largest religion in the district with over 32.3% adherents. Other religions such as Donyi-Polo, Islam and Sikhism are followed by 3.48% and 0.18% people respectively.

Flora and fauna

References

External links 

 
 Itangar Capital Complex

 
Districts of Arunachal Pradesh
Minority Concentrated Districts in India
1999 establishments in Arunachal Pradesh